Clydebank Football Club may refer to:

Clydebank F.C. (Rutherglen), an association football club which existed from 1874 to 1886, from Rutherglen in Lanarkshire
Clydebank F.C. (1888), an association football club which existed from 1888 to 1895
Clydebank F.C. (1914), a Scottish League football club which existed from 1914 to 1931
Clydebank F.C. (1965), a Scottish League football club which existed from 1965 to 2002, which ultimately became Airdrieonians F.C.
Clydebank F.C., an association football club formed in 2003 to replace the 1965 club